David Harrington Bagley (December 7, 1920 – April 7, 1992) was an admiral in the United States Navy. He was the son of four-star admiral David W. Bagley and brother of Admiral Worth H. Bagley. From 1975 to 1977, Bagley was Commander in Chief of United States Naval Forces Europe. He died of cancer in 1992 and was buried in Arlington National Cemetery.

References

External links
 David Harrington Bagley, Admiral, United States Navy at arlingtoncemetery.net, an unofficial website  

1920 births
1992 deaths
United States Navy admirals
United States Naval Academy alumni
United States Navy personnel of World War II
United States Navy personnel of the Korean War
United States Navy personnel of the Vietnam War
Recipients of the Navy Distinguished Service Medal
Recipients of the Legion of Merit
Burials at Arlington National Cemetery
Naval War College alumni